Le Louvre: The Palace & Its Paintings is a 1995 art game developed by Montparnasse Multimedia and published by BMG Interactive.

Production
The game was received six months after the founding of BMG Interactive Entertainment as an "interactive leisure" subsidiary of Bertelsmann. The game cost 1.3 million francs to make, and by February 1996 BMG had reported profits. It was one game in a series by BMG, including Musee D´Orsay, Michelangelo, Inuit.

Content
The title offers an interactive multimedia exploration of the Louvre collection.

Reception
The game sold 15,000 copies by February 1996, and by January 1997 it had sold more than 300,000 copies. Entertainment Weekly praised the game's achievements despite its graphical limitations, deeming it "thoughtful — and less taxing" than a trip to Paris. People magazine thought the game wouldn't offer new insights to art lovers, but had the potential to inspire non-art lovers to take a trip to the Louvre. Billboard felt the title was the "grandaddy" of the art-based game genre, and praised the developer's choice to narrow down the collection to 100 items to prevent the feeling of overwhelm. Newsweek deemed it "satisfying".

References

1995 video games
Art games
Educational video games
Interactive media
Louvre
Louvre Palace
Classic Mac OS games
Video games developed in France
Video games set in Paris
Windows games
Single-player video games
BMG Interactive games